Dani Sinha is a British broadcast journalist and presenter, best known for her work on BBC World News and South Today. Since 2015 she has worked as a presenter reporter for 5 News on Channel 5.

Sinha studied French and Latin at the University of Bristol before taking a postgraduate diploma in broadcast journalism at City University London.

Broadcasting career
Sinha worked as a producer at BBC Radio Berkshire before actually presenting herself. In 2006 Sinha began presenting on BBC South Today. and has covered several major stories for both South Today and BBC News.

Sinha briefly joined BBC London in 2008 as a BBC London News presenter, before returning to South Today as a regular presenter, as well as doing occasional presenting for BBC London News, the BBC News Channel and BBC World News. In 2015 she moved to ITN to work as a presenter and reporter for 5 News.

Personal life
Sinha was born in Liverpool, North West England to Indian/Irish parents. She has spent most of her adult life in the South of England. She plays piano, and enjoys skiing, yoghurt making and yoga. Her Father was a GP and her mother was a teacher for the deaf.

Dani has worked as a patron for the Hampshire-based Open Sight charity for those with blindness and impaired sight. She volunteers regularly helping sick people at Lourdes in France.

References

Living people
Television presenters from Liverpool
Year of birth missing (living people)
English television presenters
British reporters and correspondents
BBC newsreaders and journalists
English journalists
Alumni of the University of Bristol
Alumni of City, University of London
English people of Indian descent
English Roman Catholics